Reg F J Nicholls was a male athlete who competed for England.

Athletics career
He competed for England in the marathon at the 1934 British Empire Games in London.

References

English male marathon runners
Athletes (track and field) at the 1934 British Empire Games
Commonwealth Games competitors for England

Possibly living people
Year of birth missing